Shen Wei is a Chinese-American choreographer, painter, and director who resides in New York City. Widely recognized for his defining vision of an intercultural and interdisciplinary mode of movement-based performance, Shen Wei creates original works that employ an assortment of media elements, including dance, painting, sound, sculpture, theater and video. Frequently, critics have commented on his innovative blend of Asian and Western sensibilities, as well as his syncretic approach to performance art.

In 2000, he founded Shen Wei Dance Arts and became the artistic director of the contemporary dance company. The works he has created for the company is based on his own dance technique created over the past 12 years, a movement language he calls "natural body development".  In recent years, Shen Wei has expanded his artistry to include large-scale multimedia works showcasing original art installations, and original video and animation material. Shen Wei's 13 major movement-based works has toured in 30 countries in 130 cities.

Shen Wei has been commissioned by the 2008 Beijing Summer Olympics Opening Ceremony, the Park Avenue Armory, the Metropolitan Museum of Art, and the Lincoln Center Festival in New York City, and the TeatroDell'Opera di Roma, as well as contemporary ballet companies such as Les Ballets de Monte-Carlo and Les Grands Ballets Canadiens de Montreal. For each new work he choreographs, Shen Wei typically designs all the visual elements including the sets, costumes and make-up, film projection and lighting as well. In addition to creating works for the proscenium, Shen Wei has also created works for fashion shows, art exhibition openings, and other cultural productions for international companies. In July 2008, he choreographed a fashion show at Paris Haute Couture for the label WUYONG, by the Chinese designer Ma Ke.

In 2004, Shen Wei received the Nijinsky Award for Emerging Choreographer and, in 2007, he received the MacArthur Award.

China (1968–1994) early education and influences

Family background and education in the arts

Shen (family name) Wei (give name) was born in 1968 in Hunan, China to an artist family during the Chinese Cultural Revolution. His father is a Chinese opera director, performer and calligrapher, and his mother is a theater producer. Both of Shen Wei's brothers are visual artists.

Shen Wei left home at the age of nine to study classical Chinese Opera at The Hunan Arts School (now: Hunan Vocational College of the Arts) for more than 6 years (1978–1984). His training included voice, dance and theater performance. At the same time he also self-taught Chinese Traditional Painting and calligraphy. From 1984 to 1989 Shen Wei was a member of the Hunan State Xian Opera Company, performing leading roles in the company.

Following China's reestablishment of diplomatic and economic ties to the West in the early 1980s, Shen Wei began to study western classic oil painting techniques and styles of artists such as Michelangelo, da Vinci, Rembrandt, Cézanne, Modigliani, Francis Bacon and Lucian Michael Freud.

In 1989 he discovered a passion for modern dance and moved to Guangzhou to study at China's first modern dance education institution, the Guangzhou Modern Dance Academy. During his two years at the academy he was taught by master teachers such as Ross Parks and David Hochoy from the Martha Graham Dance Company, Betty Jones and Fritz Ludin from the Jose Limon Dance Company, Claudia Gitelman from Alwin Nikolais Dance Company, and Liz Walton from the Paul Taylor Dance Company. The program was jointly supported by the American Dance Festival and the Asian Cultural Council. In 1991, Shen Wei became one of the founding members of the China's first modern dance company, the Guangdong Modern Dance Company,  choreographing and dancing with the company until 1994.

Early creations

Shen Wei's early work is influenced by multiple disciplines within traditional Chinese and Western art. During the early 1990s he created 10 dance works for the Guangdong Modern Dance Company and many oil paintings. "Still Child", "Racing With The Sun", "Colored Relations" and "Insomnia" became part of the repertory of the company during this time.

Additionally, he is the one of China's first underground experimental performing artists. In 1994 he created his one-man, experimental multi-media show "Small Room", which toured in Guangzhou, Beijing, and Hong Kong, and which catapulted him into the public eye. In 1994 he was awarded the First Prize in both Choreography and Performance at the National Modern Dance Competition in China.

New York City (1995–present)

Early New York life and work (1995–1999)

After receiving a three-month scholarship from the Nikolais/Louis Dance Lab, Shen Wei moved to New York City on Jan 15, 1995 and began his 5 years of artistic experimentation in New York City. During this time he expanded his artistic knowledge, studying artists such as Andrei Tarkovsky, Federico Fellini, Mark Rothko, Henri Cartier-Bresson, Igor Stravinsky, and Steve Reich. In dance, he explored release techniques from which he began to develop his own movement language.

Shen Wei also performed for Murray Louis and was part of four of Martha Clarke's productions. Additionally, he began creating works for the American Dance Festival and Alvin Ailey II. In 1997, Cloud Gate Dance Theater toured his revised version of "The Bed" commissioned by American Dance Festival in 1995. He also toured his one-man show "Small Room" at The Palace Theater in London, The Asia Society in NYC and Hollins College in VA.

Dance and visual work in conjunction with minimalism and surrealism (1999–2001)

After 5 years of living in New York, Shen Wei began to develop a style of movement that has been described as "enigmatic" and "dream-like", and which is exemplified by "Folding" (2000),  "Near The Terrace, Part I & II" (2000–2001)  "Behind Resonance" (2001). According to Anna Kisselgoff, in these early pieces, the surrealist aesthetic emerges as a result of a disruption in what Shen Wei calls, "natural elements," such as regular breathing cycles, which affects the quality of movement in dancers. Folding and Near the Terrace have also been described as "kinetic tableus,"; the entire dance space characterized by swathes of color and sculptural movement. In 2000 after his premiere of "Near The Terrace" at the American Dance Festival (19) he formed his New York-based company, Shen Wei Dance Arts, which went on to tour at the John F. Kennedy Center for the Performing Arts, and the Switzerland Steps Festival in 2002.

Use of abstraction in choreography, music, and visual arts (2003–2005)

In 2003, Shen Wei reinterpreted Stravinsky's "Rite Of Spring", creating a piece that is accompanied by Fazıl Say's fourhanded piano version of the Stravinsky's score. Divorcing itself from any narrative element, the "stripped-to-the-bone abstraction" places emphasis on the structural power in the music, dance and visual setting. The piece had its New York debut at the Lincoln Center Festival in 2003. Shen Wei and his company also made their Australian debut at the 2005 Sydney Festival with Folding and Rite of Spring at the Sydney Opera House.

Shen Wei's "Connect Transfer" uses music by Iannis Xenakis, Kevin Volans and Gyorgy Ligeti. The work explores "internal and external body movements, as well as energy transitions," and is a synthesis of music, dance, painting, and sculpture.

"Map" is a musically inspired piece created with Steve Reich's, The Desert Music, and is accompanied with visual designs from Shen Wei's rehearsal sketches of choreographic and music arrangement structures.  The work investigates new ways of moving and has a basis in Shen Wei's Natural Body Development technique.

Abstraction in painting

Shen Wei's study of abstract expressionism is also evident in his visual artworks. Chris Mao, in Movements, writes, "Not concerned with visual impact, [Shen Wei] focused on the energy of his movements, using different kinds of brushes to convey different kinds of movements."  "Energies" and "flows" are explored on canvas as a response to auditory stimulus. This particular kind of abstraction, according to Kisselgoff, is to be distinguished from American action painting, since it does not utilize the abstract expressionist techniques of dripping or throwing paint onto canvas.  Solo exhibitions of Shen Wei's movement paintings took place in 2005 and 2007.

Re-discovering the East through personal travel (2005–2009)
Between 2005 and 2009 Shen Wei embarked on a personal journey, spending time in China (2004), Cambodia, (2005), Tibet (2005, 2006), and on China's Silk Road (2007). In 2007, he returned to Beijing in order to help direct and choreograph the 2008 Olympic Opening Ceremonies.

In the midst of this period of travel, Shen Wei produced Second Visit of the Empress, a hybrid creation that overtly fuses traditional Chinese Opera and Theater with western modern dance. This large-scale production, which is a reinvention of a traditional Chinese opera narrative, consists of four Chinese Opera Singers, sixteen Chinese Musician and fourteen American contemporary dancers. The opera melds polarities, placing narrative and abstractive, traditional and contemporary, as well as Eastern and Western expressions within a single performance space.

Re-Triptych is a meditation of Shen Wei's travels in three parts. Re-I is inspired by spirituality in Tibet; Re-II is inspired by the history of Angkor Wat in Cambodia; and Re-III explores the imagery of the Silk Road and the mutual influencing of different cultures.  The three works are based on cultural investigations—discovering different kinds of human lifestyles and social interactions. The piece integrates original movement with recordings of traditional folk music, multimedia imagery, and installation.  Re-Triptych took over three years to complete (2006–2009).

Shen Wei is the director and choreographer of the opening segment "Scroll" at the 2008 Beijing Olympic Ceremony, which references his 2004 work "Connect Transfer". He was also a lead creative consultant for the planning of the Opening Ceremony.

Multimedia, site-specific, installation performances (2010–2012)

Shen Wei's more recent works step outside the boundaries of conventional concert dance. Since 2010, he has increasingly implemented other media forms in his work, a decision which represents Shen Wei's impression of today's technology saturated society as well as what art in future may look like. His work for Ballet Monte-Carlo, "7 to 8 and," the ADF commissioned "Limited States," and "The New You" produced by the Meadows Prize Project utilize film and live projections, sound installations, still life painting in addition to his own movement language. "The New You" also contains a theater component with a script written by Shen Wei.

Site-specificity has also been prevalent in Shen Wei's work since 2010. In October 2010, his company presented a series of public performances in various locations throughout New York City. The vignettes consisted of excerpts from Re-(III), each of which were adapted for the specific urban space, which included Times Square, Wall Street, Union Square, a New York City Subway station under 42nd Street, and many others.  Prior to this, Shen Wei created a site-specific response piece to Ernesto Neto's installation, Anthropodino, at the Park Avenue Armory in New York City. Dancers and audience members moved within the collective space of Neto's immersive sculpture.

In June 2011, Shen Wei Dance Arts performed Still Moving in the American Wing of The Metropolitan Museum of Art. Commissioned by the Museum, Still Moving is, according to Shen Wei, about  "creating a dialogue between the dancers and the gallery's sculptures, between past and present, between immobility and movement." The piece consists of three parts, Restaging: Near the Terrace, Transition, and Internal External #1, all contained within the Charles Englehard Court. It is the first site-specific performance in the history of the Metropolitan Museum.

On November 29, 2011, Shen Wei Dance Arts premiered "Undivided Divided", its largest production to date. Commissioned by the Park Avenue Armory, the immersive, site-specific piece reconfigures traditional performer-audience relations so that audience members move and survey dance within the multimedia performance space. Amidst the performers and enveloped by sound and projections, audience members, in a sense, become part of the performance.  The performance of Undivided Divided at Park Avenue Armory had over 30 dancers. It will be presented, as part of the company's rep, in museums and galleries.

New Commissions, Untitled No. 12, & Untitled Painting Series (2013-2016)
In the summer of 2013, Shen Wei directed and choreographed a staging of Carl Orff's Carmina Burana. Created for and commissioned by Teatro di San Carlo in Naples, Italy, the production featured an orchestra of 100, a 100-member chorus, and 47 dancers. Critics from Arte e Arte and Teatro & Spettacolo hailed the work as an admirable synthesis of disparate cultural and media elements.

Shen Wei was also commissioned to choreograph a new work for the Dutch National Ballet in Amsterdam in celebration of the 100th anniversary of Stravinsky's Rite of Spring premiere. The work, titled Sacre du Printemps, premiered on June 15, 2013.

In June 2014, Shen Wei exhibited part of a new series of paintings, Untitled, at the Crow Collection of Asian Art in Dallas. A full exhibition of the new painting series opened at Miami Dade College Museum of Art + Design in December during the Art Basel festival and was accompanied by Shen Wei Dance Arts site-specific performances of Untitled No. 12 - 1. Both the exhibition and the performance event received extensive media coverage as one of the must-sees of the festival. This new series of paintings or tasveer consists of 11 large-scale works. In the fall of 2015, two small selections of these paintings traveled to The Tucson Museum of Art, Arizona and at The Fine Art Society in London for separate exhibitions - "Shen Wei In Black, White, and Gray" and as part of a group show "Performance and Remnant"  respectively.

In the spring of 2016, "Shen Wei: Dance Strokes" was exhibited at Asia Society Hong Kong Centre during Hong Kong Art Basel. Inspired by Miami's 2014 exhibition, seven works were shown, six of which were shown at MDC Museum of Art + Design, and one of which was a new work completed in 2015. This exhibition was also accompanied by Shen Wei Dance Arts' Untitled No. 12 - 1, as well as a site-specific performance Untitled No.32 (Bodies and Rooftop, 2016), which took place on the Joseph Lau and Josephine Lau Roof Garden. Despite not being able to exhibit a larger breadth of work, both painting exhibition and performances were well received by an international audience, especially since being reintroduced to the art world in Asia as a painter and a choreographer. This exhibition allowed viewers to see Shen Wei's work in both mediums, and draw connections between his acute sensibilities. For those who had seen his earlier work, the Movements series, debuted in Hong Kong ten years prior, an obvious development can be depicted through his technique and approach.

Shen Wei's latest work for the proscenium, Untitled No. 12 - 2, commissioned by American Dance Festival, Spoleto Festival USA, and Brooklyn Academy of Arts, draws inspiration from the paintings and Untitled No. 12 - 1. The work utilizes projections and a metronome sound scape designed by Shen Wei and played live by the dancers.

Philosophy

Shen Wei considers himself an artist that is fascinated with the human body.  In an interview with Zinta Lundborg of Bloomberg (2011), Shen Wei stated, "Dancers should show expression through their body movement. They're not actors." His "Natural Body Development" technique takes a holistic approach to dance, integrating breath-work with proprioception, visual focus, weight, and gravity. For Shen Wei, movement can be initiated by chi or breath. This idea is further guided by his philosophies of internal and external energies and how the two are mutually affecting, constantly generating and generated by the physical body. As such, Shen Wei argues against dualist philosophies, believing dancers should "develop their minds as much as their bodies." He states, "I don't use dancers to copy some movement – human beings are not just puppets. A dancer has to have a really open mind, and be willing to take a risk."

In his choreographic process, Shen Wei also employs structured improvisation, allowing dancers to use their intuitions to create novel movement assemblages. His seminal work, Rite of Spring, contains a series of carefully guided improvisations that result in a "set structure with a balance between movement exactitude and movement intuition."

Shen Wei has stated that his number one goal when making art is "inspire other human beings". He has proclaimed, "When you're an artist and you're creating new works you have to have passion because you want to make it the best that you can. You want to make it as clear as you can and you want to do things you've never done before. You want to make things that have never existed before, you want to make new things; you don't want to repeat yourself. At the same time you want people to feel these things are new, make them communicate, become part of the culture and to inspire other human beings – this is my number one goal when I make new work. That's the pressure."

Select works
Folding (2000) World Premiere: Guangdong Modern Dance Company
 Concept, Choreography, Costumes, Set and Make-up Design: Shen Wei
 Music: John Tavener and Tibetan Buddhist Chant
 Lighting: David FerriNear the Terrace-Part I (2001) World Premiere: American Dance Festival
 Concept, Choreography, Set and Costume Design: Shen Wei
 Music: Arvo Pärt
 Lighting: David FerriBehind Resonance (2001) World Premiere: SUNY Purchase
 Choreography, Set and Costume Design: Shen Wei
 Music: David Lang
 Lighting: David Ferri and Shen WeiNear the Terrace-Part II (2002) World Premiere: American Dance Festival
 Concept, Choreography, Set and Costume Design: Shen Wei
 Music: Arvo Pärt, Benjamin Iobst, music of Mangkunêgaran
 Lighting: David FerriRite of Spring (2003) Concept, Choreography, Costumes, Set and Make-up Design: Shen Wei
 Score: Igor Stravinsky
 Musical Recording: Fazıl Say
 Lighting: David FerriExhibition-Solo Painting Exhibition (2003) A series of Paintings created in conjunction with his abstracted Rite of Spring were first exhibited as part of the company's New York City debut at the Lincoln Center Festival in 2003Connect Transfer (2004) World Premiere: American Dance Festival
 Concept, Choreography, Set, and Costume Design: Shen Wei
 Music: György Ligeti, Kevin Volans, Iannis Xenakis
 Lighting: Jennifer TiptonMap (2005) World Premiere: Lincoln Center Festival
 Concept, Choreography, Costumes, Set Design: Shen Wei
 Music: Steve Reich
 Lighting: David Scott BolmanThe Second Visit To the Empress (2005, 2007) World Premiere: American Dance Festival 2005
 Direction, Choreography, Set, Make-up and Costume Design: Shen Wei
 Music: Traditional Chinese Beijing Opera
 Lighting: Jennifer TiptonExhibition-Solo Painting Exhibition - Movements (2005) Hong Kong New Vision Arts Festival with Chambers Fine Arts in New York 2005Re-Part I (2006) Concept, Choreography, Set and Costume Design: Shen Wei
 Music: Traditional Tibetan Chant
 Vocals: Ani Choying Dolma
 Lighting: Jennifer TiptonRe-Part II (2007) Concept, Choreography, Set and Costume Design; and Sounds and Images recorded at Angkor Wat: Shen Wei
 Music: John Tavener's "Tears of the Angels," with Traditional Cambodian Music, and Original recordings by Shen Wei
 Lighting: Jennifer Tipton
 Projection Design: Shen Wei & Daniel HartnettExhibition-Solo Painting Exhibition - Movements (2007) Chambers Fine Arts in New York 2007Fashion Show at Paris Haute Couture-WUYONG, by the Chinese designer Ma Ke (2007) Direction, Choreography and Co-installation design for 40 performing artists at the Palais Royale in Paris: Shen WeiThe Beijing Olympic Opening Ceremony "Scroll" Segment 2008 Direction and Choreography: Shen Wei
 Original Score: Chen Qi-Gung
 General Director of the Opening Ceremony: Zhang YimouRe-Part III (2009) Concept, Choreography, Set and Costume Design; and Sounds and Images recorded on China's Silk Road: Shen Wei
 Original Score: David Lang
 Recorded Violinist: Todd Reynolds
 Lighting: Jennifer Tipton
 Projection Design: Shen Wei and Daniel Hartnett7 to 8 and (2010) World Premiere: Les Ballets de Monte-Carlo
 Choreography and visual and projection design: Shen Wei
 Original Score: Dirk HaubrichNYC Guerilla-Site Specific Work (2010) Sites: Times Square, Wall Street, Union Square, 42nd Street, outside of New York Public Library Main Branch, outside of The Metropolitan Museum of Art, Columbia University, and Battery Park
 Concept and Choreography: Shen Wei
 Performed by: Shen Wei Dance ArtsStill Moving (2011) World Premiere: Metropolitan Museum of Art
 Concept, Choreography, and Visual Design: Shen Wei
 Original Score: Daniel Burke
 Costume: Shen Wei and Austin ScarlettLimited States (2011) World Premiere: American Dance Festival
 Concept, Choreography, Video and Animation Design: Shen Wei
 Original Score: Daniel Burke
 Lighting: Shen Wei and Matthew F. Lewandowski II
 Costume: Shen Wei and Austin ScarlettUndivided Divided (2011) World-premiere: Park Avenue Armory
 Concept, Choreography and Visual Design: Shen Wei
 Original Score: Sō Percussion
 Lighting: Jennifer Tipton
 Video and Animation: Josh Horowitz, Layne Braunstein and Blair Neal
 Costume: Austin Scarlett
 Sound Design: Lawson WhiteExhibition-Solo Exhibition and Installation Performance (2012) Mana Contemporary in New Jersey, USA. March 11 – June 11, 2012The New You (2012)
 World Premiere: The Meadows School of the Arts at Southern Methodist University, Dallas, TX
 Concept, Direction, Choreography and Visual Design: Shen Wei

Carmina Burana (2013)

 World Premiere: Teatro San Carlo, Napoli, Italy
 Concept, Choreography, and Direction: Shen Wei
 Program Carl Orff: Carmina Burana / Anonymous, Four Cantiones profanae (orchestrated by Jordi Bernácer)
 Director of Music: Jordi Bernácer
 Chorus Master: Salvatore Caputo
 Director of Ballet: Alessandra Panzavolta
 Director of Children's Choir: Stefania Rinaldi
 Sets and costumes: Shen Wei
 Angela Nisi, soprano; Valdis Jansons, baritone; Ilham Nazarov, countertenor
 Soloists from Shen Wei Dance Arts: Cecily Campbell, Cynthia Koppe, Evan Copeland, Alex Dean Speedie
 Orchestra, Choir, Ballet and Children's Choir of the Teatro di San Carlo

Sacre Du Printemps (2013)

 World Premiere: The Amsterdam Music Theatre
 Commissioned and Performed by: Dutch National Ballet
 Choreography, Set, and Costumes: Shen Wei
 Music: Igor Stravinsky, Le Sacre du Printemps
 Accompaniment: Holland Symfonia conducted by Matthew Rowe

Exhibition-Solo Painting Exhibition - "Shen Wei: In Black, White and Gray (2014) Miami Dade College Museum of Art + Design in Miami, Florida. December 5, 2014 – February 1, 2015
 11 paintings, oil and acrylic on canvasUntitled No. 12 - 1 (2014, 2016)

 Concept, Choreography, Costumes: Shen Wei
 Sound Design: Metronome Collage by Shen Wei, played live by dancers
 Performed alongside painting exhibition, Shen Wei: In Black, White and Gray, at Miami Dade College Museum of Art + Design 2014
 Performed alongside painting exhibition, Shen Wei: Dance Strokes, at Asia Society Hong Kong Centre 2016

Untitled No 12 - 2 (2015)

 Concept, Choreography, Direction, Set and Costumes: Shen Wei
 Music: Echoes from the Gorge, Chou Wen-chung
 Sound Design: Metronome Collage by Shen Wei, played live by dancers
 Lighting Design: Christina Watanabe-Jensen
 Projection Images: Selections from Black, White, and Gray painting series by Shen Wei
 Projection Realization: Rocco DiSanti
 Commission: Spoleto Festival USA, American Dance Festival, Brooklyn Academy of Music

Exhibition-Solo Painting Exhibition - "Shen Wei In Black, White and Gray (2015) The Tucson Museum of Art, Tucson, Arizona. October 9 – December 6, 2015
 5 paintings, oil and acrylic on canvas
 Hosted simultaneously with Shen Wei Dance Arts performanceExhibition-Group Painting Exhibition - "Performance and Remnant (2015) The Fine Art Society, London, UK. October 9 – 31, 2015
 3 paintings, oil and acrylic on canvas
 Other artists included: Justin Davis Anderson, Jo Broughton, Ori Gersht, John Giorno, Andy Goldsworthy, Rashaad Newsome, Michael Petry, and Geraldine SwayneExhibition-Solo Painting Exhibition - "Shen Wei: Dance Strokes (2016) Asia Society Hong Kong Centre, Hong Kong. March 20 – April 4, 2016
 7 paintings, oil and acrylic on canvas
 In conjunction with Shen Wei Dance Arts' Untitled No. 12 - 1 and Untitled No. 32 (Bodies and Rooftop)Untitled No. 32 (Bodies and Rooftop) (2016)
 Asia Society Hong Kong Centre, Joseph Lau and Josephine Lau Roof Garden
 Site-specific
 Concept and Choreography: Shen Wei
 Performed by: Shen Wei Dance Arts
 Set and Production: Andy Y.O. Tsui
 Music: Echoes From The Gorge by Chou Wen-Chung

Awards and distinctions

 New York City Center Artist-in-Residence Fellow (2012)
 Artist to Artist Award for Exceptional Merit in Contribution to the Arts (2011)
 Park Avenue Armory Artist-in-Residence Fellow (2011)
 Algur H. Meadows Prize (2010)
 Asian American Arts Alliance Award (2010)
 Young Global Leader Honoree, World Economic Forum (2009)
 MacArthur Foundation Fellow (2007)
 US Artist Fellow (2007)
 The John F. Kennedy Performing arts Center Five Years Artist in Residency (2007–2013)
 Les Etoiles de Ballet at the Palais des Festival (2006)
 Helpmann Awards for Performing Arts in Australia: Best Ballet or Dance Work (2005)
 Nijinsky Award for Emerging Choreographer (2004)
 Guggenheim Fellow (2001)
 New York Foundation for the Arts Fellowship (2000)
 Asian Cultural Council Fellowship (1995)
 First Prize at the National Modern Dance Competition, China (1994)

See also
 Chinese Americans in New York City
 LGBT culture in New York City
 List of self-identified LGBTQ New Yorkers

References

External links
 Personal Site
 Company Site

1968 births
American choreographers
American male dancers
Chinese choreographers
Chinese emigrants to the United States
Chinese male dancers
Film directors from Hunan
Contemporary dance choreographers
Living people
MacArthur Fellows
Artists from Changsha
Artists from New York City
Chinese film directors
Film directors from New York City